Mora River, also known as Rio Mora, is a stream in Mora and San Miguel County, New Mexico. Its headwaters are on Osha Mountain of the Sangre de Cristo Mountains. The river flows downstream primarily through private land, but there are areas for fishing brown and rainbow trout below on public land in the town of Mora. It is a tributary of Canadian River. It was called Rio Mora or Rio de lo de Mora on early maps. There is a separate stream Rio Mora that is a tributary of Pecos River.

Course
The headwaters are located in the Sangre de Cristo Mountains near Chacon. The stream flows south through Mora, east through La Cueva and Watrous to the confluence at Canadian River, north of Sabinoso.

Tributaries
Coyote Creek, which runs through Coyote Creek State Park, is a tributary of Mora River.

See also
 List of rivers of New Mexico

References

Rivers of San Miguel County, New Mexico
Rivers of Mora County, New Mexico